This is a list of urban agglomerations and cities (those not included in the Urban Agglomerations), with a population above 100,000 as per 2011 census in the Indian state of Bihar:

Urban Agglomeration
In the census of India 2011, an Urban Agglomeration has been defined as follows:

"An urban agglomeration is a continuous urban spread constituting a town and its adjoining outgrowths (OGs), or two or more physically contiguous towns together with or without outgrowths of such towns. An Urban Agglomeration must consist of at least a statutory town and its total population (i.e. all the constituents put together) should not be less than 20,000 as per the 2001 Census. In varying local conditions, there were similar other combinations which have been treated as urban agglomerations satisfying the basic condition of contiguity."

Constituents of Urban Agglomerations in Bihar
The constituents of Urban Agglomerations in Bihar, with a population of 100,000 or above, are noted below:

 Patna Urban Agglomeration includes  Patna (M Corp.), Badalpura (OG), Pataliputra Housing Colony (CT), Phulwari Sharif (NP), Nohsa (CT), Danapur (NP), Dinapur Cantonment (CB), Khagaul (NP) and Saidpura (CT).
 Gaya Urban Agglomeration includes Gaya (M Corp.), Kaler (OG) and Paharpur (CT).
 Bhagalpur Urban Agglomeration includes Bhagalpur (M Corp.) and Habibpur (CT).
 Muzaffarpur Urban Agglomeration includes Muzaffarpur (M Corp.), Damodarpur (CT), Dumari urf Damodarpur Shahjahan (CT), Majhauli Khetal (CT), Yehiapur (CT) and Shekhpura (CT).
 Purnia Urban Agglomeration includes Purnia (M Corp.) and Kasba (NP).
 Darbhanga Urban Agglomeration includes Darbhanga (M Corp.), Padri (CT) and Bahadurpur (CT).
 Katihar Urban Agglomeration includes Katihar (M Corp.+OG) and Katihar Railway Colony (OG).
 Chapra Urban Agglomeration includes Chapra (M Corp.) and Sanrha (CT).
 Bettiah Urban Agglomeration includes Bettiah (M Corp.), Tola Mansaraut (CT), Kargahia Purab (CT) and Hat Saraiya (CT). 
 Nawada Urban Agglomeration includes  Nawada (NP) and Bhadauni (CT).
 Buxar Urban Agglomeration includes Buxar (NP) and Sarimpur (CT).
 Sitamarhi Urban Agglomeration includes Sitamarhi (NP), Rajopatti urf Kota Bazar (CT), Talkhapur Dumra (CT) and Dumra (NP).

Abbreviations: M Corp. = Municipal corporation, NP = Nagar panchayat, CT = Census town, OG= Out Growth, CB = Cantonment Board

Urban Agglomeration constituents
Urban Agglomerations constituents with a population above 100,000 as per 2011 census are shown in the table below.

See also 

 India
 Bihar
 Government of Bihar
 Administration in Bihar
 Cities in Bihar
 Districts of Bihar
 Divisions of India
 Subdivisions of Bihar
 Blocks in Bihar
 Villages in Bihar

References 

Cities
Bihar